Pedro García (2 May 1928 – 12 July 1980) was a Peruvian sports shooter. He competed in the 25 metre pistol event at the 1960 Summer Olympics.

References

1928 births
1980 deaths
Peruvian male sport shooters
Olympic shooters of Peru
Shooters at the 1960 Summer Olympics
People from Talara
20th-century Peruvian people